David Mark (born 1948), former President of the Senate of Nigeria and Senator for the Benue South constituency of Benue State.

David Mark may also refer to:

David Mark (journalist) (born 1973), American journalist and author of two books on American politics
David Mark (novelist), (born 1977), British novelist, police procedurals based in Scotland
David Mark (scientist), (born 1947), University at Buffalo Professor of Geography
David E. Mark (1923–2005), American diplomat

See also

David Marks (disambiguation)